Serra Azul is a municipality in the state of São Paulo in Brazil. The population is 14,981 (2020 est.) in an area of 283 km². The elevation is 610 m.

References

Municipalities in São Paulo (state)